The Cleveland Court Apartments 620–638 is a historic apartment building in the Cleveland Court Apartment Complex in Montgomery, Alabama.  It is significant to the history of the modern Civil Rights Movement in the United States. Unit 634 was home to civil rights activist Rosa Parks, her husband Raymond, and her mother, Leona McCauley, during the Montgomery bus boycott from 1955 to 1956. The building was placed on the Alabama Register of Landmarks and Heritage on March 30, 1989 and the National Register of Historic Places on October 29, 2001.

See also
National Register of Historic Places listings in Montgomery County, Alabama
Properties on the Alabama Register of Landmarks and Heritage in Montgomery County, Alabama

References

National Register of Historic Places in Montgomery, Alabama
Buildings and structures in Montgomery, Alabama
African-American history in Montgomery, Alabama
Properties on the Alabama Register of Landmarks and Heritage
Apartment buildings in Alabama
Residential buildings on the National Register of Historic Places in Alabama
Apartment buildings on the National Register of Historic Places
Public housing in the United States